is a railway station in Kōtō, Tokyo, Japan, operated by Tokyo Metro and Yurikamome.

Lines
Toyosu Station is served by the Tokyo Metro Yurakucho Line subway and the Yurikamome.

Station layout
The station consists of an underground metro station (numbered Y-22) on the Tokyo Metro Yurakucho Line, and an elevated station forming the eastern terminus of the Yurikamome Line (station number U-16).

Tokyo Metro

Platforms
The subway station has two island platforms located on the third basement ("B3F") level, serving four tracks. Originally the two centre tracks were built since the opening and reserved for the future extension to Sumiyoshi, on which were completed on 1 March 2013 for use by terminating services from Wakoshi from the start of the revised timetable on 16 March 2013. Following the timetable revision on 15 October 2019 however, tracks 2 and 3 were temporarily shut down and subsequently covered up as a measure to alleviate congestion during the upcoming 2020 Tokyo Olympics, however it is not decided whether the tracks will be used again.

Yurikamome

Platforms
The station consists of a single elevated island platform serving two terminating tracks.

History

The Tokyo Metro station platforms were renumbered 1 to 4 from 1 March 2013 following completion of the two centre tracks for use by terminating trains.

Passenger statistics
In fiscal 2012, the Tokyo Metro station was used by an average of 160,196 passengers daily. The passenger figures for previous years are as shown below.

Surrounding area
Toyosu has gained popularity due to the increase in high-rise apartments, such as Park City Toyosu, The Toyosu Tower, City Towers Toyosu, and the large shopping mall known as Lalaport Toyosu.

Other places of note in the vicinity include the following.

 Gas Science Museum
 Shibaura Institute of Technology
 Showa University Toyosu Hospital
 Toyosu Library
 Fukagawa No. 5 Junior High School
 Toyosu Elementary School
 Toyosu-kita Elementary School
TeamLab Planets TOKYO DMM.com

See also
 List of railway stations in Japan

References

External links

 Toyosu Station information (Tokyo Metro) 
 Toyosu Station information (Yurikamome)

Railway stations in Japan opened in 1988
Railway stations in Japan opened in 2006
Stations of Tokyo Metro
Tokyo Metro Yurakucho Line
Railway stations in Tokyo